USS Facility (AM-233) was an  built for the United States Navy during World War II. The ship was ordered and laid down as  USS PCE-906 but was renamed and reclassified before her June 1944 launch as Facility (AM-233). After earning three battle stars for service in the Pacific during World War II, she was decommissioned in September 1946 and placed in reserve. While in reserve, Facility was reclassified as MSF-233 in February 1955 but never reactivated. In October 1962, she was sold to the Mexican Navy and renamed ARM DM-04. Her ultimate fate is not reported in secondary sources; she may have been out of service by April 1973 when another member of the Admirable class was acquired by the Mexican Navy and given the name DM-04.

U.S. Navy career 
After completion, she was commissioned on 29 November 1944.

Facility underwent shakedown training and proceeded to San Pedro, Los Angeles, and thence to Pearl Harbor, arriving on 17 February. After escorting the minelayer  to Eniwetok early in March, Facility began sweeping under the command of Task Group TG 52.5 preliminary to the assault landings on Okinawa on 1 April. She continued to support the operation until damaged by a near miss during a heavy suicide attack and was forced to put into Ulithi on 22 April for repairs. She resumed sweeping operations, and, after replenishing supplies in Buckner Bay, joined Task Group TG 52.4 to participate with TG 52.3 in clearing the approaches to Nagasaki, Japan.

Late in September she swept the Bungo Suido and other areas of the Inland Sea. The rest of the year was occupied in overhaul at Hiro Wan and in sweeping the Van Dieman Straits.
 
In the first two months of 1946 Facility journeyed from Sasebo to Saipan, Eniwetok, and Pearl Harbor before making her first return to the States. She underwent overhaul at San Pedro, Los Angeles, transited the Panama Canal on 22 March, and on to Galveston, Texas. While she remained in reserve at Galveston, she was reclassified as a Fleet Minesweeper (Steel Hull), MSF-233 on 7 February 1955. She was struck from the Naval Vessel Register on 1 May 1962 and sold to Mexico on 2 October. USS Facility received three battle stars for World War II service.

Mexican Navy career 
The former Facility was acquired by the Mexican Navy on 2 October 1962 and renamed ARM DM-04. Her fate is not reported in secondary sources; she may have been out of service by April 1973 when another member of the Admirable class was acquired by the Mexican Navy and also named DM-04.

Notes

References 
 
 

PCE-905-class patrol craft
Admirable-class minesweepers
Ships built by Lockheed Shipbuilding and Construction Company
1944 ships
World War II patrol vessels of the United States
World War II minesweepers of the United States
Admirable-class minesweepers of the Mexican Navy